El-Mehdi Sallah Diab (born 1958) is a Libyan sprinter. He competed in the men's 400 metres at the 1980 Summer Olympics.

References

1958 births
Living people
Athletes (track and field) at the 1980 Summer Olympics
Libyan male sprinters
Olympic athletes of Libya
Place of birth missing (living people)